is a Japanese rugby union player. He was named in Japan's squad for the 2015 Rugby World Cup.

References

External links
 Top League Profile, in Japanese
 Toshiba Brave Lupus profile, in Japanese
 

1988 births
Living people
Tokai University alumni
Japanese rugby union players
Japan international rugby union players
Toshiba Brave Lupus Tokyo players
People from Aomori (city)
Rugby union props
Sunwolves players